Kepler-451b, also known as 2MASS J19383260+4603591 b, is a circumbinary exoplanet orbiting the star 2MASS J19383260+4603591. It has a mass of 604±32 Earth Masses or 1.9±0.1 Jupiter Masses. It was discovered using Eclipse Timing Variations by the Kepler space telescope in 2015.

The existence of the planet was disputed in 2020 though, but in 2022 a confirmation was announced.

References

Exoplanets discovered in 2015
Giant planets
451b
Circumbinary planets